Madagascar competed at the 2015 African Games held in Brazzaville, Republic of the Congo.

Medal summary

Medal table

Tennis 

Zarah Razafimahatratra won the silver medal in the women's singles event.

Weightlifting 

Madagascar won two medals in weightlifting.

References 

Nations at the 2015 African Games
2015
African Games